Cara Black and Liezel Huber were the defending champions, but lost in the semifinals against Samantha Stosur and Rennae Stubbs.

Nuria Llagostera Vives and María José Martínez Sánchez won in the final 2–6, 7–5, [11–9] against Samantha Stosur and Rennae Stubbs.

Seeds
The top four seeds receive a bye into the second round.

Draw

Finals

Top half

Bottom half

External links
 Official results archive (ITF)
 Official results archive (WTA)

Cup - Doubles
Rogers